Mola dels Quatre Termes, also known as Mola d'Estat, is a summit in the Serra del Bosc range, Prades Mountains, Catalonia, Spain. It has an elevation of 1,117 metres above sea level.

See also
Prades Mountains
Mountains of Catalonia

References

Mountains of Catalonia